Sevilay Öztürk (born November 28, 2003) is a Turkish Paralympic swimmer. She competes in the disability category of S5 in freestyle, backstroke and butterfly, specializing in sprint events. She competed in the 2016 Summer Paralympics.

Personal history
Sevilay Öztürk was born to Bülent Öztürk and Hülya as their first child on November 28, 2003. She has no arms as a birth defect (bilateral congenital upper extremity agenesis).

Very much supported by her father, she was schooled in the neighborhood. She learned to use her foot for writing.

Swimming career
Öztürk began swimming in 2010 after she met Beytullah Eroğlu at a hospital in her hometown, the successful national Paralympic swimmer, who has also bilateral limb deficiency.
She began with regular swimming exercise in 2013. She won three gold and two silver medals in the national Para swimming championships. She internationally debuted at the 30th International German Championships in Berlin in June 2016. She was qualified for the 2016 Summer Paralympics, and represented her country in Rio de Janeiro, Brazil. She was the youngest competitor at all. She failed to capture any medal. She took part at the 2017 European Para Youth Games held in Liguria, Italy, and won the gold medal in the 50 m Backstroke S5 event.

Öztürk's disability swimming classification is S5 due to her limb deficiency as a birth defect.

At the 2019 World Para Swimming Championships in London, U.K., she won the bronze medal in the 50 m butterfly S5 event with a time of 47.35.

Achievements

References

Living people
2003 births
Sportspeople from Kahramanmaraş
Sportswomen with disabilities
Paralympic swimmers of Turkey
S5-classified Paralympic swimmers
Swimmers at the 2016 Summer Paralympics
Turkish female butterfly swimmers
Turkish female backstroke swimmers
Turkish female freestyle swimmers
Medalists at the World Para Swimming Championships
Swimmers at the 2020 Summer Paralympics
Medalists at the 2020 Summer Paralympics
Paralympic medalists in swimming
Paralympic bronze medalists for Turkey
21st-century Turkish sportswomen